U.S. Route 521 (US 521) is a north–south United States Highway that traverses , from Georgetown, South Carolina, to Charlotte, North Carolina. Though numbered as an auxiliary route of US 21, it does not actually intersect its parent or any of its sibling routes, though it is in the same general part of the country as other routes from its family. Historically, it once connected to US 21 in Pineville, North Carolina, but various changes have left it terminating a few miles short of the current US 21.

Route description

South Carolina
Starting at the city of Georgetown, US 521 runs through the town Andrews to Greeleyville. From here to the city of Manning it is known as the Greeleyville Highway. There is a brief section right before Manning where it runs concurrent with SC 261. In Manning SC 261 branches off and US 521 merges with US 301 for a short distance. It crosses over Interstate 95 (I-95) and heads to the city of Sumter. In Sumter, it runs together with US Business 378. Leaving Sumter, US 521 is known as Camden Highway. It passes under I-20 and proceeds to Camden. It then goes on to the town of Kershaw, running concurrent with US 601. The final city it goes through before going into North Carolina is Lancaster.

North Carolina
US 521 traverses  from the South Carolina state line to I-485. The entire route is a four- to six-lane divided highway, split in naming between Lancaster Highway and Johnston Road.

History
Established in 1932, it was overlapped entirely with SC 26, from Georgetown to the North Carolina state line, where it continued with NC 26 into Pineville, where it ended at U.S. Route 21/NC 261 (now NC 51). In 1933, SC 26 was decommissioned; followed in 1934 with the decommissioning of NC 26.

In 1949, US 521 was rerouted in Williamsburg County to run directly from Andrews, through Salters and Greeleyville, to Manning; which replaced SC 171 and part of SC 261, the old alignment became part of SC 377 and SC 261. Between 1962 and 1964, US 521 was rerouted at the Sumter-Kershaw county line to Camden; the old alignment became an extension of SC 261.

Between 1986 and 1988, US 521 was moved west onto new highway west of Dalzell, bypassing the town; the old alignment was downgraded to secondary roads.

In 1996, US 521 was rerouted onto I-485, between exits 61 and 65; the old alignment was downgraded to secondary roads. In 2003, the American Association of State Highway and Transportation Officials (AASHTO) approved US 521 to be truncated at its current northern terminus at the Johnston Road/I-485 interchange; its old alignment north to I-85 was downgraded to secondary roads.

Future
There are plans to make US 521 a four-lane highway from Georgetown to I-95, in Manning. This would improve a route for beach goers traveling toward the Litchfield/Pawleys area.

Junction list

Special routes

See also

References

External links

Endpoints of US 521

21-5
21-5
21-5
Transportation in Georgetown County, South Carolina
Transportation in Williamsburg County, South Carolina
Transportation in Clarendon County, South Carolina
Transportation in Sumter County, South Carolina
Transportation in Kershaw County, South Carolina
Transportation in Lancaster County, South Carolina
Transportation in Mecklenburg County, North Carolina
Transportation in Charlotte, North Carolina
5